Amir Osmanović (born 7 June 1970) is a Bosnian-Herzegovinian retired professional footballer who played as a forward for several clubs in Europe and Asia.

Club career
Osmanović played for FK Radnički Lukavac in the Bosnian-Herzegovinian Premier League. He also had a spell with Chemnitzer FC in the German Regionalliga.

International career
He made his debut in Bosnia and Herzegovina's first ever official international game, coming on as a second half substitute for Husref Musemić in a November 1995 friendly match away against Albania. It remained his sole international appearance.

References

External links
 

1970 births
Living people
People from Lukavac
Association football forwards
Yugoslav footballers
Bosnia and Herzegovina footballers
Bosnia and Herzegovina international footballers
Bosniaks of Bosnia and Herzegovina
FK Radnički Lukavac players
NK Maribor players
Chemnitzer FC players
FC Winterthur players
Shandong Taishan F.C. players
Xiamen Blue Lions players
Tianjin Jinmen Tiger F.C. players
Slovenian PrvaLiga players
Premier League of Bosnia and Herzegovina players
Regionalliga players
Swiss Challenge League players
Chinese Super League players
China League One players
Bosnia and Herzegovina expatriate footballers
Expatriate footballers in Slovenia
Bosnia and Herzegovina expatriate sportspeople in Slovenia
Expatriate footballers in Germany
Bosnia and Herzegovina expatriate sportspeople in Germany
Expatriate footballers in Switzerland
Bosnia and Herzegovina expatriate sportspeople in Switzerland
Expatriate footballers in China
Bosnia and Herzegovina expatriate sportspeople in China